Alt Hüttendorf station is a railway station in the municipality of Althüttendorf, located in the Barnim district in Brandenburg, Germany.

References

Railway stations in Brandenburg
Buildings and structures in Barnim